Kings Grant is a neighborhood located within the Lynnhaven section of Virginia Beach, Virginia, United States. Transportation routes within Kings Grant include Kings Grant Road, North Lynnhaven Road and Little Neck Road. Schools serving Kings Grant include Kings Grant and Kingston Elementary Schools, Lynnhaven Middle School and First Colonial High School. The neighborhood is heavily treed and has several lakes and many marshes. 

Communities in Virginia Beach, Virginia